Sparone is a comune (municipality) in the Metropolitan City of Turin in the Italian region of Piedmont, located about  northwest of Turin in the Canavese.

It is home to the Romanesque church of Santa Croce, of medieval origin, which houses several Gothic frescoes.

The communal territory includes several frazioni: Aia di Pietra, Apparè, Barchero, Bisdonio, Bose, Budrer, Calsazio, Ceresetta, Costa, Feilongo, Frachiamo, Nosè, Onzino, Piani, Sommavilla, Torre, and Vasario.

References

Cities and towns in Piedmont
Canavese